Iraqis are people who originate from the country of Iraq. Iraq consists largely of most of ancient Mesopotamia, the native land of the indigenous Sumerian, Akkadian, Assyrian, and Babylonian civilizations, which was subsequently conquered, invaded and ruled by foreigners for centuries after the fall of the indigenous Mesopotamian empires. As a direct consequence of this long history, the contemporary Iraqi population comprises a significant number of different ethnicities. However, recent studies indicate that the different ethno-religious groups of Iraq (Mesopotamia) share significant similarities in genetics, likely due to centuries of assimilation between invading populations and the indigenous ethnic groups. Iraqi Arabs are the largest ethnic group in Iraq, while Kurds are the largest ethnic minority, Turkmens are the third largest ethnic group, while other ethnic groups include Yazidis, indigenous Assyrians, Mandaeans, Armenians, and Marsh Arabs.

The daily language of the majority of Iraqis is Mesopotamian Arabic, and has been ever since the Muslim conquest of Mesopotamia and the replacement of Akkadian-influenced Aramaic, most notably during the Abbasid Caliphate during of which Baghdad became the capital of the caliphate and the center of Islamic Golden Age. However, Mesopotamian Arabic is considered to be the most Aramaic-influenced dialect of Arabic, due to Aramaic having originated in Mesopotamia, and spread throughout the Fertile Crescent during the Neo-Assyrian period, eventually becoming the lingua franca of the entire region prior to the Islamic invasions of Mesopotamia.  In addition, Neo-Aramaic, Kurdish, Turkish and Mandaic are other languages spoken by Iraqis and recognized by Iraq's constitution.

History

In ancient and medieval times Mesopotamia was the political and cultural centre of many great empires and civilizations, such as the Akkadian Empire, Assyria, Assyrian Empire and Babylon Empire. The ancient Mesopotamian civilization of Sumer is the oldest known civilization in the world, and thus Iraq is widely known as the Cradle Of Civilization. Iraq remained an important centre of civilization for millennia, up until the Muslim conquest of Mesopotamia and subsequently  Abbasid Caliphate (of which Baghdad was the capital), which was the most advanced empire of the medieval world (see Islamic Golden Age). Hence Mesopotamia has witnessed several emigration and immigration in the past.

Further information on Iraq's civilization and cultural history can be found in the following chronology of Iraqi history:
 Nemrik 9 (9800 BC – 8200 BC)
 Jarmo (7000 – 5000 BC)
 Sumer (6500 – 1940 BC)
Ubaid period (6500 – 4000 BC)
Uruk period (4000 – 3000 BC)
Early Dynastic period (3000 – 2334 BC)
 Sumer and Akkad (1900 – 539 BC)
Akkadian Empire (2334 – 2218 BC)
Gutian dynasty (2218 – 2047 BC)
Neo-Sumerian Empire (2047 – 1940 BC)
 Akkadian era
Babylonia (1900 - 539 BC)
Assyria (1900 – 609 BC)
Neo-Assyrian Empire (745 – 626 BC)
Neo-Babylonian Empire (626 – 539 BC)
Fall of Babylon (539 BC)
 Achaemenid Empire (539 – 330 BC)
Achaemenid Assyria (539 – 330 BC)
 Seleucid Babylonia (331 – 141 BC)
 Parthian Babylonia (141 BC – 224)
Araba (100 BC – 240)
Adiabene (15 – 116)
 Sassanid Persia (224 – 638)
Asuristan (224 – 638)
Lakhmids (266 – 633)
 Islamic conquest (632 – 1258)
Rashidun Caliphate (638 – 661)
Umayyad Caliphate (661 – 750)
Abbasid Caliphate (750 – 1258)
 Ilkhanate (1258 – 1335)
 Turkic dynasties (1335 – 1501)
Jalayirid Sultanate (1335 – 1410)
Kara Koyunlu (1410 – 1468)
Ak Koyunlu (1468 – 1501)
 Safavid dynasty (1501 – 1533)
 Ottoman Empire (1533 – 1918)
Mamluk dynasty (1747 – 1831)
 British Mandate for Mesopotamia (1920 – 1932)
 Kingdom of Iraq (1932 – 1958)
 Republic of Iraq (1958 –)
Ba'athist Iraq (1968 – 2003)

Genetics

One study found that Haplogroup J-M172 originated in northern Iraq. In spite of the importance of this region, genetic studies on the Iraqi people are limited and generally restricted to analysis of classical markers due to Iraq's modern political instability, although there have been several published studies displaying a genealogical connection between all Iraqi peoples and the neighboring countries, across religious, ethnic and linguistic barriers. Studies indicate that the different ethno-religious groups of Iraq (Mesopotamia) share significant similarities in genetics and that Mesopotamian Arabs, who make up the majority of Iraqis, are more genetically similar to Iraqi Kurds than other Arab populations in the Middle East and Arabia.

No significant differences in Y-DNA variation were observed among Iraqi Mesopotamian Arabs, Assyrians, or Kurds. Modern genetic studies indicate that Iraqi Arabs and Iraqi Kurds are distantly related, though Iraqi Mesopotamian Arabs are more related to Iraqi-Assyrians than they are to Iraqi Kurds.

For both mtDNA and Y-DNA variation, the large majority of the haplogroups observed in the Iraqi population (H, J, T, and U for the mtDNA, J-M172 and J-M267 for the Y-DNA) are those considered to have originated in Western Asia and to have later spread mainly in Western Eurasia. The Eurasian haplogroups R1b and R1a represent the second most frequent component of the Iraqi Y-chromosome gene pool, the latter suggests that the population movements from Central Asia into modern Iran also influenced Iraq.

Many historians and anthropologists provide strong circumstantial evidence to posit that Iraq's Marsh Arabs share very strong links to the ancient Sumerians—the oldest human civilization in the world and most ancient inhabitants of central-southern Iraq.

The Iraqi-Assyrian population was found to be significantly related to other Iraqis, especially Mesopotamian Arabs, likely due to the assimilation of indigenous Assyrians with other people groups who occupied and settled Mesopotamia after the fall of the Neo-Babylonian Empire.

Studies have reported that most Irish and Britons have ancestry to Neolithic farmers who left ancient Mesopotamia over 10,000 years ago. Genetic researchers say they have found compelling evidence that, on average, four out of five (80%) Europeans can trace their Y chromosome to the ancient Near East. In another study, scientists analyzed DNA from the 8,000-year-old remains of early farmers found at an ancient graveyard in Germany. They compared the genetic signatures to those of modern populations and found similarities with the DNA of people living in today's Turkey and Iraq.

Language
Iraq's national languages are Arabic and the Kurdish languages. The two main regional dialects of Arabic spoken by the Iraqi people are Mesopotamian Arabic (spoken in the Babylonian alluvial plain and Middle Euphrates valley) and South Mesopotamian Arabic and North Mesopotamian Arabic (spoken in the Assyrian highlands). The two main dialects of Kurdish spoken by Kurdish people are Central Kurdish (spoken in the Erbil and Sulaymaniyah Governorates) and Northern Kurdish (spoken in Dohuk Governorate). In addition to Arabic, most Assyrians and Mandaeans speak Neo-Aramaic languages. Mesopotamian Arabic has an Aramaic substratum.

Religion and ethnic groups

Arabs are the largest people group in Iraq, while Kurds are the largest ethnic minority. Turkmens are the third largest ethnic group in the country. The population was estimated to be 39,650,145 in 2021 (residing in Iraq), with most of the population being Shia  (15 million), Sunni (9 million), followed by Kurds (8 million), Turkmen (3 million), Assyrians and Armenians (500,000), Yazidis (500,000), Marsh Arabs, and Shabaks, Persians (500,000) (250,000). Other minorities include Mandaeans (6,000), Roma (50,000) and Circassians (2,000). The most spoken languages are Mesopotamian Arabic, Kurdish, Iraqi Turkmen dialects and Syriac. The percentages of different ethno-religious groups residing in Iraq vary from source to source due to the last Iraqi census having taken place over 30 years ago. A new census of Iraq was planned to take place in 2020.

Iraq has many devout followers of its religions. In 1968 the Iraqi constitution established Islam as the official religion of the state as the majority of Iraqis are Muslim. 

In addition, many Iraqi people are Christians belonging to various Christian denominations. The majority of Iraqi Christians are indigenous Chaldean Catholic Assyrians, whilst non-Syriac Christians are mostly Iraqi Arabs and Armenians. Iraqi-Assyrians largely belong to belong to the Syriac Orthodox Church, the Assyrian Church of the East, Chaldean Catholic Church, Ancient Church of the East, and the Syriac Catholic Church. Iraqi Arab Christians belong to the Greek Orthodox Church of Antioch and the Melkite Greek Catholic Church of Antioch, and Iraqi-Armenians belong to the Armenian Orthodox Church and Armenian Catholic Church. Their numbers inside Iraq have dwindled to around 500,000+ since 2003.

Other religious groups include Mandaeans, Shabaks, Yazidis and followers of other minority religions. Furthermore, Jews had also been present in Iraq in significant numbers historically, and Iraq had the largest Jewish population in the Middle East, but their population dwindled, after virtually all of them migrated to Israel between 1949 and 1952. From 1949 to 1951, 104,000 Jews were evacuated from Iraq in Operations Ezra and Nechemia (named after the Jewish leaders who took their people back to Jerusalem from exile in Babylonia beginning in 597 B.C.E.); another 20,000 were smuggled out through Iran.

Diaspora

The Iraqi diaspora is not a sudden exodus but one that has grown rapidly through the 20th century as each generation faced some form of radical transition or political conflict. From 1950 to 1952 Iraq saw a great exodus of roughly 120,000 - 130,000 of its Jewish population under the Israel-led "Operation Ezra and Nehemiah". There were at least two large waves of expatriation of both Christians and Muslims alike. A great number of Iraqis left the country during the regime of Saddam Hussein and large numbers have left during the Iraq war and its aftermath.

See also
 Demographics of Iraq
 List of Iraqis

References

External links
 Mesopotamia: Birthplace of civilisation
 Iraqi identity - Forces for Integration/ Divisiveness

 
People
Ethnic groups in the Middle East
Ethnic groups in Iraq
Arabs